Labor Day is a federal holiday in the United States celebrated on the first Monday in September.

Labor Day or Labour Day may also refer to:

Holidays
 Labour Day or Labor Day, an annual holiday to celebrate the achievements of the workers
 International Workers' Day or Labour Day
 Labour Day (Singapore)

Other uses
 Labor Days, a 2001 album by Aesop Rock
 Labour Day (album), a 1988 album by Spirit of the West
 Labor Day (novel), a 2009 novel by Joyce Maynard
 Labor Day (film), a 2013 film based on the novel
 "Labor Day" (Roseanne), a 1994 television episode
 "Labour Day" (Class of the Titans), a 2006 television episode

See also
 1935 Labor Day hurricane
 Labor Day in Spain
 Labor Day in Toledo, Spain
 Mayday (disambiguation)